Duets is an album by American composer, bandleader and keyboardist Carla Bley with bassist Steve Swallow recorded and released on the Watt/ECM label in 1988.

Reception
The Allmusic review by David Nelson McCarthy awarded the album 4½ stars and stated that "their tremendous musical rapport and precise wit are really beautiful. It comes highly recommended". The Penguin Guide to Jazz awarded it 3 stars, stating that it is "an entertaining album and an ideal primer on Bley's compositional and improvising techniques".

Track listing
All compositions by Carla Bley except where noted.
 "Baby Baby" - 6:28  
 "Walking Batteriewoman" - 4:01  
 "Útviklingssang" - 4:42  
 "Ladies in Mercedes" (Steve Swallow) - 5:44  
 "Romantic Notion No. 3" - 7:02  
 "Remember" (Swallow) - 5:24  
 "Ups and Downs" - 6:16  
 "Reactionary Tango (In Three Parts)" (Bley, Swallow) - 8:44  
 "Soon I Will Be Done With the Troubles of This World" (Traditional) - 6:58  
Recorded at Grog Kill Studio, Willow, New York in the Summer of 1988.

Personnel
Carla Bley - piano
Steve Swallow - bass guitar

References

ECM Records albums
Carla Bley albums
Steve Swallow albums
1988 albums